Tūroa Kiniwe Royal  D.Litt. (Hon) QSO ED is a Māori educationist. Born in 1935, Royal dedicated his long career to improving Māori educational achievement and was involved in numerous innovations in New Zealand education utilising aspects of Māori culture, language and ideas. He was a teacher at Tāmaki College, Auckland , a Department of Education Inspector of Māori and Island Education, and principal of Wellington High School for eight years. Educational institutes he was part of founding are Whitireia Polytechnic in Porirua north of Wellington and Te Wānanga-o-Raukawa in Ōtaki. He was also heavily involved in the establishment of the World Indigenous Nations Higher Education Consortium.

Early life 
Tūroa Royal was born on the 28th of January 1935, at Waimangō Point, on the Firth of Thames, just north of Kaiaua. His parents were Robert Haunui Tukumana Royal of Ngāti Whanaunga, Ngāti Tamaterā and Ngāti Raukawa. His mother was Meri Te Oi Tamehana of Ngāpuhi and Ngāti Hine. 

One of Royal’s siblings was Wiremu Taurau Royal, the first registered Māori architect.  

Royal grew up on the family farm, a remnant block within the lands of his Ngāti Whanaunga people. The block was first converted into a farm by his paternal adopted grandfather, Tukumana Te Taniwha of Ngāti Whanaunga and later by his father Haunui.

Tribal (Iwi) Affiliations 
Through his father, Royal belongs to the iwi (tribes) of Ngāti Whanaunga and Ngāti Tamaterā of the Hauraki region and Ngāti Raukawa of the Horowhenua region, near Wellington. His family name, Royal or Te Roera, comes from Ngāti Raukawa. 

On his mother’s side, Royal belongs to Ngāpuhi and Ngāti Hine. His maternal grandfather was Te Oi Tamehana of Ngāti Kōpaki, Ngāti Hine. His maternal grandmother was Hana Toi of the Ngāti Korokoro and Ngāti Whārara peoples of Ōmāpere, Hokianga.

As Royal was born and raised at Waimangō, Firth of Thames, within the lands of Ngāti Whanaunga, this is his primary tribal affiliation. His family continue to maintain ‘ahi kā’ (home fires) at Waimangō and many of Royal’s immediate family members (including his parents and some of his siblings) are interred in the family cemetery at Waimangō.

Education 

Royal attended Kaiaua Primary School (commencing in 1940) and Wesley College, near Pukekohe. Encouraged by his mother’s brother, Rev Māori Marsden, Royal enrolled at the University of Auckland in 1953.

In 1975, Royal completed a Masters of Education Administration (M.EdAdmin) at the University of New England, Armidale, New South Wales, Australia.

Career 

Royal spent his career seeking ways of uplifting Māori educational achievement at all levels of schooling and tertiary education. 

In 1959, Royal published an article in the Te Ao Hou magazine entitled 'A Māori Child Grows up in Auckland'. The article provides an overview of primary, secondary and tertiary education as it relates to Māori in Auckland at the time. Royal expresses a number of views that would become key themes in his subsequent career. 

In 1968, Royal contributed to a Race Relations Seminar at the University of Waikato where it was reported that he said that "There is an urgent need to advance Maori education sufficiently to prevent the development of an unemployable proletariat... The nation cannot afford to waste any of the ability of its children, and we should develop the most untapped professional talent of the Maori people for the benefit of all." He went on further to say, "If other races are setting about the task of integrating and adapting to the needs of modern society, the Maori should certainly not lag behind... As part of the New Zealand population, and indeed a growing proportion playing an important part in the economy, the Maori has right to all the facilities in which he can grow and reach his full intellectual capacity."

The use of Māori language and culture was an important dimension of his approach to Māori education and he was critical of ‘mono-cultural bias’ in schooling.

During the 1960s, he taught at Tāmaki College, Auckland and from 1970 to 1978, he was an Inspector of Māori and Island Education, for the then Department of Education of the New Zealand Government. From 1978 to 1986 he was Principal of Wellington High School and from 1996 to 2006 he was Foundation Director of Whitireia Polytechnic, Porirua. In 1980, Royal introduced bilingual and whānau based schooling into Wellington High School, one of the very first schools in New Zealand to do so.

From 1981 to 2011, Royal was heavily involved in the establishment of Te Wānanga-o-Raukawa in Ōtaki. He undertook numerous roles during its establishment phase including governance, management and teaching roles.

Royal was a founder of the World Indigenous Higher Education Consortium (WINHEC). Between 2002 and 2008 he was Chairperson of the Consortium.

Awards 
In 2009, Royal was awarded an Honorary Doctorate of Literature by Massey University, Palmerston North. The citation awarding the Honorary Doctorate to Royal acknowledged his commitment to Māori education sustained over more than 50 years. 

In the 2013 New Year Honours he was made a Companion of the New Zealand Order of Merit. He received his insignia from Governor General Sir Jerry Mateparae on 23 May 2013.

Writings 

'The Maori Child Grows up in Auckland' in Te Ao Hou, June 1959

The World Indigenous Nations Higher Education Consortium WINHEC in WINHEC: International Journal of Indigenous Education Scholarship

Personal life 
Royal married Maryrose Wells in 1959. They had six sons, including Te Ahukaramū Charles Royal.

References 

Living people
1935 births
Māori education in New Zealand
Companions of the New Zealand Order of Merit
Ngāti Whanaunga people
Ngāti Tamaterā people
Ngāti Raukawa people
Ngāpuhi people
Ngāti Hine people
New Zealand educators
People from Waikato